Shell Creek Township is a township in Platte County, Nebraska, United States. The population was 955 at the 2020 census. A 2021 estimate placed the township's population at 939.

A small portion of the Village of Platte Center lies within the Township.

Its namesake Shell Creek runs through it.

See also
County government in Nebraska

References

External links
City-Data.com

Townships in Platte County, Nebraska
Townships in Nebraska